Flora Mutahi is a Kenyan accountant, entrepreneur and corporate executive. She is chairperson of the Kenya Association of Manufacturers. She is also the founder and Chief Executive Officer of Melvin Marsh International Limited the manufacturer of Melvin's Tea, a Kenyan brand.

Background and education
She was born in Kenya and attended local schools for her primary and secondary education. She has a Bachelor of Science Degree in Accounting and Finance, obtained from the United States International University. She also has an Executive Master of Business Administration, awarded by the University of Cape Town in South Africa. She is a Certified Public Accountant.

Work history
At the beginning, Mutahi borrowed money from her mother, in order to qualify for a bank loan. She first ventured into manufacturing salt. Later she started her tea business. She also has started rice processing and marketing. She is most known for Melvin Marsh International, the company she founded in 1995, where she has served as CEO, since.

Family
Flora Mutahi is a married mother of three children.<ref name="Two

Other considerations
In July 2016, Mutahi was appointed chairperson of the Kenya Association of Manufacturers, the first woman to occupy that office, since the founding of the association in 1959. In November 2017, she was elected vice-chairperson of the business council of the Common Market of Eastern and Southern Africa (COMESA). Mutahi is a member of the board of directors of Seed Hope, a Kenyan non-profit striving to improve the living conditions of the slum-dwellers in the Kibera shanty town.

See also
 Angela Ndambuki
 Phyllis Wakiaga
 Carol Musyoka
 Carole Kariuki

References

External links
Website of Melvin Marsh International Limited

1970s births
Living people
Women accountants
Kenyan accountants
Kenyan chief executives
21st-century Kenyan businesswomen
21st-century Kenyan businesspeople
University of Cape Town alumni
United States International University alumni
People from Nairobi
20th-century Kenyan businesswomen
20th-century Kenyan businesspeople